Life of the Party is a 1920 American comedy-drama film starring Roscoe "Fatty" Arbuckle. A copy of the film is held by the Library of Congress.

Plot
Attorney Algernon Leary (Roscoe Arbuckle), "pure milk" candidate for mayor, attends a party for grown-ups dressed as children. Going home in a blizzard, he is robbed of his fur coat, leaving him bare legged wearing rompers. He takes refuge in the first building he can reach, creating havoc in various apartments due to his appearance. He blunders into the rival candidate, Judge Voris (Frank Campeau) in a compromising situation with a vamp and forces him to withdraw, ensuring Leary's election as mayor after a whirlwind campaign.

Cast

 Roscoe Arbuckle as Algernon Leary
 Winifred Greenwood as Mrs. Carraway
 Roscoe Karns as Sam Perkins
 Julia Faye as 'French' Kate
 Frank Campeau as Judge Voris
 Viora Daniel as 	Milly Hollister
 Allen Connor as Jake
 Fred Starr as Bolton (credited as Frederick Starr)

Film still synopsis
The December 1921 Film Fun provided a synopsis of the film using stills.

See also
 Fatty Arbuckle filmography

References

External links

 
 allmovie/synopsis Life of the Party (1920) synopsis, allrovi.com
 
 

1920 films
1920 comedy-drama films
American comedy-drama films
American silent feature films
American black-and-white films
Films directed by Joseph Henabery
Films based on short fiction
Articles containing video clips
1920s American films
Silent American comedy-drama films